US Mondorf-les-Bains is a football club, based in Mondorf-les-Bains, in south-eastern Luxembourg.

Current squad
As of 5 February, 2023.

External links
US Mondorf-Les-Bains official website

 
Football clubs in Luxembourg
US Mondorf
US Mondorf